Guarabira is a municipality in the state of Paraíba in the Northeast Region of Brazil. It was founded in 1837. It is the seat of the Roman Catholic Diocese of Guarabira.

See also
List of municipalities in Paraíba

References

Municipalities in Paraíba